The 1976 Birmingham International was a men's tennis tournament played on indoor carpet courts. It was the fourth edition of the Grand Prix Birmingham, and part of the 1976 USTA Indoor Circuit. It took place in Birmingham, Alabama, United States from January 20 through January 25, 1976. First-seeded Jimmy Connors won the singles title, his third consecutive at the event, and earned $10,000 first-prize money.

Finals

Singles 
 Jimmy Connors defeated  Roscoe Tanner 6–4, 3–6, 6–1
 It was Connors' 1st singles title of the year and the 42nd of his career.

Doubles 
 Jimmy Connors /  Erik van Dillen defeated  Hank Pfister /  Dennis Ralston 6–3, 6–2

References

External links
 ITF tournament edition details

Birmingham International
Birmingham International
Birmingham International